The Fire was a Women's Professional Lacrosse League (WPLL) professional women's field lacrosse team based in Philadelphia, Pennsylvania.  They have played in the WPLL since the 2018 season and were disbanded after the 2019 season on February 27, 2020.  In the 2018 season, the five teams in the WPLL will play on a barnstorming format, with all five teams playing at a single venue.

Roster

2018 season

References

Women's Professional Lacrosse League
Women's lacrosse teams in the United States
Lacrosse teams in Pennsylvania
Sports teams in Philadelphia
Lacrosse clubs established in 2018
2018 establishments in Pennsylvania
Women's sports in Pennsylvania